The United States court case of Moore v. Younger,  (Cal. App. 1976) originated from a somewhat ambiguous law, California's Harmful Matter Statute.  California Attorney General Evelle J. Younger "claimed that individual librarians could be prosecuted for giving juveniles access to questionable reading materials."  University of California, Los Angeles Librarian Everett T. Moore, as plaintiff, challenged the Attorney General through legal action.  In February 1976, one month after he retired from UCLA, Moore won his case.  All librarians in California were found to be exempt from the Harmful Matter Statute by the California Court of Appeals.

References

External links
California Harmful Matter Statute
Excerpt from Everett T. Moore
Penal Code Section 313-313.5

Censorship in the United States
California state case law
1976 in United States case law
1976 in California